Verkhny Frolovsky (Ürge Frolovka) is a rural locality (a village) in Inzersky Selsoviet, Arkhangelsky District, Bashkortostan, Russia. The population was 28 as of 2010. There is 1 street.

Geography 
Verkhny Frolovsky is located 40 km northeast of Arkhangelskoye (the district's administrative centre) by road. Mikhaylovka is the nearest rural locality.

References 

Rural localities in Arkhangelsky District